Kavita Devi is an Indian politician from Bihar and a Member of the Bihar Legislative Assembly. Devi won the Korha on the Bharatiya Janata Party ticket in the 2020 Bihar Legislative Assembly election.

References 

Living people
Bihar MLAs 2020–2025
Bharatiya Janata Party politicians from Bihar
1975 births